Vampir-Cuadecuc is  a 1970 Spanish experimental feature film written, produced, and directed by Pere Portabella. It stars Christopher Lee, Herbert Lom, Soledad Miranda, and Jack Taylor. The film tells an abbreviated version of the Dracula story using behind-the-scenes footage from the Jesús Franco film Count Dracula.

Plot

The film tells the story of Dracula using behind-the-scenes footage from the making of the film Count Dracula, complete with scenes of the cast and crew working on the film in between takes. The film also shows how the special effects and sets of the film were designed, often splicing these moments with footage of the actors. With the exception of the final scene, which features Christopher Lee explaining the end of the novel, the film is mostly silent, with sparse music and sound effects sparingly used.

Cast
 Christopher Lee as himself/Dracula
 Herbert Lom as himself/Prof. Van Helsing
 Soledad Miranda as herself/Lucy Westenra
 Jack Taylor as himself/Quincey Morris

Reception

J. Hoberman of The New York Times praised the film, calling it "ghostly" and "among the most highly regarded avant-garde films of the past half century". James Evans of Starburst Magazine gave it seven out of ten stars, commending the cinematography, and soundtrack.

References

External links
 

1970 films
1970s avant-garde and experimental films
1970 independent films
Dracula films
Spanish vampire films
Spanish black-and-white films
English-language Spanish films
Spanish avant-garde and experimental films
Spanish independent films
1970s English-language films
Films directed by Pere Portabella